Romodanovsky (masculine), Romodanovskaya (feminine), or Romodanovskoye (neuter) may refer to:
Romodanovsky (family), a princely family of Rurikid stock
Romodanovsky District, a district of the Republic of Mordovia, Russia